Ivan Mortimer Linforth (15 September 1879, San Francisco – 15 December 1976, Berkeley, California) was an American scholar, Professor of Greek at University of California, Berkeley. According to the Biographical Dictionary of North American Classicists he was "one of the great Hellenists of his time". He is best known for his book The Arts of Orpheus (1941). In it he analysed the body of texts dealing with Orpheus and the Orphics. He concluded that there was no exclusively 'Orphic' system of belief in Ancient Greece.

Notes

External links
 
Obituary notice

1879 births
1976 deaths
University of California, Berkeley faculty